Cave Spring or Cave Springs may refer to a location in the United States:

Cave Springs, Arkansas
Cave Spring, Georgia
Cave Spring Commercial Historic District, Cave Spring, GA, listed on the NRHP in Georgia
Cave Spring Residential Historic District, Cave Spring, GA, listed on the NRHP in Georgia
Cave Springs, Kansas
Cave Spring (Lexington, Kentucky), listed on the NRHP in Kentucky
Cave Spring (Kansas City, Missouri), listed on the NRHP in Missouri
Cave Spring, Oklahoma
Cave Spring, Virginia

See also
Subterranean river